South Africa competed at the 2007 World Championships in Athletics, but did not win any medals.

Competitors

References

Nations at the 2007 World Championships in Athletics
World Championships in Athletics
South Africa at the World Championships in Athletics